Peter Daane (March 26, 1835January 7, 1914) was a Dutch American immigrant, businessman, and Wisconsin pioneer.  He was a member of the Wisconsin State Assembly, representing southern Sheboygan County during the 1873 session.

Biography

Peter Daane was born in Westkapelle, Zeeland, in the Netherlands.  As a child in 1842, he emigrated with his family to the United States and settled at Pultneyville, New York.  In 1847, they moved west to Milwaukee, Wisconsin Territory, then north to Sheboygan County, Wisconsin, where they settled on a farm in the town of Holland.  Daane was educated in the public schools of New York and Wisconsin and went to work as a merchant.

In the second year of the American Civil War, Daane volunteered for service in the Union Army and was enrolled as a sergeant in Company F in the 27th Wisconsin Infantry Regiment.  He was later promoted to first sergeant, and was commissioned first lieutenant in July 1864.  Daane served with the regiment in the western theater of the war, participating in the Vicksburg campaign and campaigns in Alabama and Arkansas.

After the war, Daane served as assessor of the town of Holland and chairman of the Holland Town Board. In 1873, Daane served in the Wisconsin State Assembly and was a Republican. In 1879, Daane bought a mill, elevator, and lumberyard in Oostburg, Wisconsin. He also served as postmaster of Oostburg, Wisconsin. Daane died in Oostburg, Wisconsin of a heart ailment.

Electoral history

Wisconsin Assembly (1872)

| colspan="6" style="text-align:center;background-color: #e9e9e9;"| General Election, November 4, 1872

References

1835 births
1914 deaths
Dutch emigrants to the United States
People from Veere
People from Wayne County, New York
People from Oostburg, Wisconsin
People of Wisconsin in the American Civil War
Businesspeople from Wisconsin
Farmers from Wisconsin
Mayors of places in Wisconsin
Republican Party members of the Wisconsin State Assembly
19th-century American politicians